The Lally School of Management was founded in 1963 as part of Rensselaer Polytechnic Institute.  Its current mission statement is "To bridge management and technology to create sophisticated global business leaders who are prepared to guide their organizations in the conversion of pioneering ideas and analytical insights into innovative products, processes, and businesses."

The school is housed in the historic Pittsburgh Building on 110 8th Street on RPI's campus in Troy, New York.

History
The Lally school, founded in 1963, is relatively new to RPI, which was founded in 1824. The Lally school was originally solely a management program for engineers. It was originally housed in the Jonsson Engineering Center and Lally Management Center, before finally being moved to the larger Pittsburgh Building. The management school was named after Rensselaer trustee Kenneth T. Lally and his wife, Thelma P. Lally. Kenneth T. Lally has been an important member of the Rensselaer community since 1970. The Lallys wanted the school to be known throughout the world as the "best of the breed". Lally, an entrepreneur who saved the historic W.& L.E Gurley Company (now Gurley Precision Instruments), knew the challenge of managing a technological venture. To help the management school gain national prominence, the Lallys gave $15 million, which was, up until 2001, the largest single gift in Rensselaer's history. To honor the benefactors and to more properly reflect the school's unique focus, the school became the Kenneth T. and Thelma P. Lally School of Management and Technology.

The Pittsburgh Building was completed in 1912 and originally contained the administrative offices of the institute, the library, and the Geological and Mineralogical Museum. "It was presented by the members of the Pittsburgh Alumni Association, and has cost furnished about $150,000."

Administration
Acting Dean: Chanaka Edirisinghe

Acting Associate Dean: Shyam Kumar

Ph.D. Program Director: T. Ravichandran

Director of MBA and M.S. Programs: Dorit Nevo

Interim Undergraduate Program Director: Clint Ballinger

Academics

The Lally school offers the following programs:

Full-time Residential 
Executive MBA
Ph.D. Program
Undergraduate Management Degree
Graduate Management Degrees
Specialized Corporate Programs

As part of an experiential learning environment, students work on the patent portfolio from Rensselaer’s Office of Commercialization in the Incubator as part of their strategy class.  They take on real-world problems and research for local companies; and work with faculty on radical innovation projects for large, established firms.

Severino Center for Technological Entrepreneurship

The Paul J. ’69 and Kathleen M. Severino Center for Technological Entrepreneurship (SCTE) helps foster new generations of budding and successful entrepreneurs through outreach programs, education and support systems.

Centered in Rensselaer’s Lally School of Management & Technology, the Severino Center lies at the core of Lally’s commitment to Entrepreneurship, providing a broad-based platform for entrepreneurs to make the transition from concept to company.

The mission of the SCTE is to expose every Rensselaer student to the practices and principles of entrepreneurship and to extend Rensselaer’s leadership and national prominence in technological entrepreneurship. 
The center implements this mission by:

Providing and supporting opportunities to learn fundamental principles of entrepreneurship and study historical cases of successful entrepreneurs; 
Providing opportunities to listen to, interact with, and work with experienced entrepreneurs; 
Helping students with ideas for new innovations to find resources for commercializing their ideas, and helping students who are seeking businesses opportunities to find and initiate them; 
Guiding, mentoring and coaching student-based start-up businesses; 
Connecting students who are starting businesses to resources and networks within and beyond the Rensselaer community.

The mission also states that the Center will focus on technological entrepreneurship, meaning that attention and resources are primarily, though not solely, directed at entrepreneurial principles, experiences and new business initiatives specifically driven by novel or advanced technology.

References

External links 
Official Site

Rensselaer Polytechnic Institute
Business schools in New York (state)
Educational institutions established in 1963
1963 establishments in New York (state)